Río Blanco (Spanish for white river) is a river in the municipality of Ponce, Puerto Rico. It is located in the northeastern area of the municipality. It empties into the Río Prieto. Together with the Río Prieto, the Río Blanco is one of the two rivers in Ponce with their mouth at the highest elevation (both at 1,381 feet). This river is one of the 14 rivers in the municipality.

Origin and course
The Río Blanco originates in the mountains of barrio Anón in Ponce, right at the foot of PR-143, in the Toro Negro State Forest, and cuts through the northern mountains of Barrio Anón. It runs for about 1.8 kilometers before it is fed by Quebrada Jamiel (Jamiel Brook). After this it runs for about 0.2 kilometer before it feeds into Río Prieto, some 800 feet southwest of the intersection of PR-139 and Camino La Poblada.

See also

 List of rivers of Puerto Rico
 List of rivers of Ponce

Notes

References

External links
 USGS Hydrologic Unit Map – Caribbean Region (1974)

Rivers of Puerto Rico
Rivers of Ponce, Puerto Rico